Karkon may refer to:
 Karkon-e Olya
 Karkon-e Sofla